An election to Devon County Council took place on 2 May 2013 as part of the 2013 United Kingdom local elections. 62 councillors were elected from electoral divisions which returned one county councillor each by first-past-the-post voting for a four-year term of office. The electoral divisions were the same as those used at the previous election in 2009. No elections were held in Plymouth and Torbay, which are unitary authorities outside the area covered by the County Council.

All locally registered electors (British, Irish, Commonwealth and European Union citizens) who were aged 18 or over on Thursday 2 May 2013 were entitled to vote in the local elections. Those who were temporarily away from their ordinary address (for example, away working, on holiday, in student accommodation or in hospital) were also entitled to vote in the local elections, although those who had moved abroad and registered as overseas electors cannot vote in the local elections. It is possible to register to vote at more than one address (such as a university student who had a term-time address and lives at home during holidays) at the discretion of the local Electoral Register Office, but it remains an offence to vote more than once in the same local government election.

Summary
The election saw the Conservative Party maintain overall control with a reduced majority of fourteen seats. The Liberal Democrats remained the council's largest single opposition party, while the Labour Party made a net gain of one seat. UKIP took its first seats on the council, winning four. The Green Party regained its seat (Totnes Rural) following an interim defection to the Labour Party. The election also saw three independent councillors elected.

Results 
 

|}

Note: seat changes reflect the council composition immediately before the election, taking into account the defection of the Liberal Democrat councillor for Exwick & St Thomas to the Labour Party, and the June 2012 defection of the Green Party councillor for Totnes Rural to the Labour Party.

Election result by division

Alphington and Cowick

Ashburton and Buckfastleigh

Axminster

Barnstaple North

Barnstaple South

Bickleigh and Wembury

Bideford East

Bideford South and Hartland

Bovey Tracey Rural

Braunton Rural

Broadclyst and Whimple

Budleigh

Chudleigh Rural

Chulmleigh and Swimbridge

Combe Martin Rural

Crediton Rural

Cullompton Rural

Dartmouth and Kingswear

Dawlish

Duryard and Pennsylvania

Exminster and Kenton

Exmouth Brixington and Withycombe

Exmouth Halsdon and Woodbury

Exmouth Littleham and Town

Exwick and St. Thomas

Fremington Rural

Hatherleigh and Chagford

Heavitree and Whipton Barton

Holsworthy Rural

Honiton St. Michael's

Honiton St. Paul's

Ilfracombe

Ivybridge

Kingsbridge and Stokenham

Kingsteignton

Newton Abbot North

Newton Abbot South

Newton St. Cyres and Sandford

Newtown and Polsloe

Northam

Okehampton Rural

Ottery St. Mary Rural

Pinhoe and Mincinglake

Priory and St. Leonard's

Seaton Coastal

Sidmouth Sidford

South Brent and Dartington

South Molton

St. Davids and St. James

St. Loyes and Topsham

Tavistock

Teign Estuary

Teignbridge South

Teignmouth

Thurlestone, Salcombe and Allington

Tiverton East

Tiverton West

Torrington Rural

Totnes Rural

Willand and Uffculme

Yealmpton

Yelverton Rural

References

2013
2013 English local elections
2010s in Devon